Fabrizio Fanucci (born 3 October 1956) is an Italian former professional tennis player and coach. Players he coached include Potito Starace, Adrian Ungur and Filippo Volandri.

The son of a chef, Fanucci began competing on the professional circuit in the late 1970s. His most noteworthy performance was a win over the eighth seeded John Alexander at the 1981 Alitalia Open, held in his native Florence.

References

External links
 
 

1956 births
Living people
Italian male tennis players
Italian tennis coaches
Sportspeople from Florence